Clelia Durazzo Grimaldi (1760–1830), also known as Clelia Durazzo, was a botanist and marchesa in Genoa, Italy.

She was the daughter of Giacomo Filippo Durazzo and Maddalena Pallavicini. Her father was a member of one of the most illustrious and aristocratic Genoese families, as well as a notable naturalist and bibliophile in his own right. After her marriage to Giuseppe Grimaldi of the House of Grimaldi, she dedicated herself to the study of botany, and in 1794 established a private botanical garden, the Giardino botanico Clelia Durazzo Grimaldi on the grounds of her residence, the Villa Durazzo-Pallavicini. She also collected some 5,000 plant specimens in a herbarium, subsequently donated to the Civico Museo Doria di Storia Naturale di Genova.

Notes and references

Angela Valenti Durazzo, I Durazzo da schiavi a dogi della Repubblica di Genova, Genoa 2004.
Luca Leoncini, Da tintoretto a Rubens. Capolavori della Collezione Durazzo, Skira, Genoa 2004.

19th-century Italian women scientists
Women botanists
1760 births
1830 deaths
Durazzo Grimaldi, Clelia
Nobility from Genoa
18th-century Italian botanists
19th-century Italian botanists
18th-century Italian women scientists
Scientists from Genoa